Polyclonal B cell response is a natural mode of immune response exhibited by the adaptive immune system of mammals. It ensures that a single antigen is recognized and attacked through its overlapping parts, called epitopes, by multiple clones of B cell.

In the course of normal immune response, parts of pathogens (e.g. bacteria) are recognized by the immune system as foreign (non-self), and eliminated or effectively neutralized to reduce their potential damage. Such a recognizable substance is called an antigen. The immune system may respond in multiple ways to an antigen; a key feature of this response is the production of antibodies by B cells (or B lymphocytes) involving an arm of the immune system known as humoral immunity. The antibodies are soluble and do not require direct cell-to-cell contact between the pathogen and the B-cell to function.

Antigens can be large and complex substances, and any single antibody can only bind to a small, specific area on the antigen. Consequently, an effective immune response often involves the production of many different antibodies by many different B cells against the same antigen. Hence the term "polyclonal", which derives from the words poly, meaning many, and clones from Greek klōn, meaning sprout or twig; a clone is a group of cells arising from a common "mother" cell. The antibodies thus produced in a polyclonal response are known as polyclonal antibodies.  The heterogeneous polyclonal antibodies are distinct from monoclonal antibody molecules, which are identical and react against a single epitope only, i.e., are more specific.

Although the polyclonal response confers advantages on the immune system, in particular, greater probability of reacting against pathogens, it also increases chances of developing certain autoimmune diseases resulting from the reaction of the immune system against native molecules produced within the host.

Humoral response to infection 

Diseases which can be transmitted from one organism to another are known as infectious diseases, and the causative biological agent involved is known as a pathogen. The process by which the pathogen is introduced into the body is known as inoculation, and the organism it affects is known as a biological host. When the pathogen establishes itself in a step known as colonization, it can result in an infection, consequently harming the host directly or through the harmful substances called toxins it can produce. This results in the various symptoms and signs characteristic of an infectious disease like pneumonia or diphtheria.

Countering the various infectious diseases is very important for the survival of the susceptible organism, in particular, and the species, in general. This is achieved by the host by eliminating the pathogen and its toxins or rendering them nonfunctional. The collection of various cells, tissues and organs that specializes in protecting the body against infections is known as the immune system. The immune system accomplishes this through direct contact of certain white blood cells with the invading pathogen involving an arm of the immune system known as the cell-mediated immunity, or by producing substances that move to sites distant from where they are produced, "seek" the disease-causing cells and toxins by specifically binding with them, and neutralize them in the process–known as the humoral arm of the immune system. Such substances are known as soluble antibodies and perform important functions in countering infections.

B cell response 

Antibodies serve various functions in protecting the host against the pathogen. Their soluble forms which carry out these functions are produced by plasma B cells, a type of white blood cell. This production is tightly regulated and requires the activation of B cells by activated T cells (another type of white blood cell), which is a sequential procedure. The major steps involved are:
Specific or nonspecific recognition of the pathogen (because of its antigens) with its subsequent engulfing by B cells or macrophages. This activates the B cell only partially.
Antigen processing.
Antigen presentation.
Activation of the T helper cells by antigen-presenting cells.
Co-stimulation of the B cell by activated T cell resulting in its complete activation.
Proliferation of B cells with resultant production of soluble antibodies.

Recognition of pathogens 

Pathogens synthesize proteins that can serve as "recognizable" antigens; they may express the molecules on their surface or release them into the surroundings (body fluids). What makes these substances recognizable is that they bind very specifically and somewhat strongly to certain host proteins called antibodies. The same antibodies can be anchored to the surface of cells of the immune system, in which case they serve as receptors, or they can be secreted in the blood, known as soluble antibodies. On a molecular scale, the proteins are relatively large, so they cannot be recognized as a whole; instead, their segments, called epitopes, can be recognized. An epitope comes in contact with a very small region (of 15–22 amino acids) of the antibody molecule; this region is known as  the paratope. In the immune system, membrane-bound antibodies are the B-cell receptor (BCR). Also, while the T-cell receptor is not biochemically classified as an antibody, it serves a similar function in that it specifically binds to epitopes complexed with major histocompatibility complex (MHC) molecules. The binding between a paratope and its corresponding antigen is very specific, owing to its structure, and is guided by various noncovalent bonds, not unlike the pairing of other types of ligands (any atom, ion or molecule that binds with any receptor with at least some degree of specificity and strength). The specificity of binding does not arise out of a rigid lock and key type of interaction, but rather requires both the paratope and the epitope to undergo slight conformational changes in each other's presence.

Specific recognition of epitope by B cells 

In figure at left, the various segments that form the epitope have been shown to be continuously collinear, meaning that they have been shown as sequential; however, for the situation being discussed here (i.e., the antigen recognition by the B cell), this explanation is too simplistic. Such epitopes are known as sequential or linear epitopes, as all the amino acids on them are in the same sequence (line). This mode of recognition is possible only when the peptide is small (about six to eight amino acids long), and is employed by the T cells (T lymphocytes).

However, the B memory/naive cells recognize intact  proteins present on the pathogen surface. In this situation, the protein in its tertiary structure is so greatly folded that some loops of amino acids come to lie in the interior of the protein, and the segments that flank them may lie on the surface. The paratope on the B cell receptor comes in contact only with those amino acids that lie on the surface of the protein. The surface amino acids may actually be discontinuous in the protein's primary structure, but get juxtaposed owing to the complex protein folding patterns (as in the adjoining figure). Such epitopes are known as conformational epitopes and tend to be longer (15–22 amino acid residues) than the linear epitopes.  Likewise, the antibodies produced by the plasma cells belonging to the same clone would bind to the same conformational epitopes on the pathogen proteins.

The binding of a specific antigen with corresponding BCR molecules results in increased production of the MHC-II molecules. This assumes significance as the same does not happen when the same antigen would be internalized by a relatively nonspecific process called pinocytosis, in which the antigen with the surrounding fluid is "drunk" as a small vesicle by the B cell. Hence, such an antigen is known as a nonspecific antigen and does not lead to activation of the B cell, or subsequent production of antibodies against it.

Nonspecific recognition by macrophages 

Macrophages and related cells employ a different mechanism to recognize the pathogen. Their receptors recognize certain motifs present on the invading pathogen that are very unlikely to be present on a host cell. Such repeating motifs are recognized by pattern recognition receptors (PRRs) like the toll-like receptors (TLRs) expressed by the macrophages. Since the same receptor could bind to a given motif present on surfaces of widely disparate microorganisms, this mode of recognition is relatively nonspecific, and constitutes an innate immune response.

Antigen processing 

After recognizing an antigen, an antigen-presenting cell such as the macrophage or B lymphocyte engulfs it completely by a process called phagocytosis. The engulfed particle, along with some material surrounding it, forms the endocytic vesicle (the phagosome), which fuses with lysosomes. Within the lysosome, the antigen is broken down into smaller pieces called peptides by proteases (enzymes that degrade larger proteins). The individual  peptides are then complexed with major histocompatibility complex class II (MHC class II) molecules located in the lysosome – this method of "handling" the antigen is known as the exogenous or endocytic pathway of antigen processing in contrast to the endogenous or cytosolic pathway, which complexes the abnormal proteins produced within the cell (e.g. under the influence of a viral infection or in a tumor cell) with MHC class I molecules.

An alternate pathway of endocytic processing had also been demonstrated wherein certain proteins like fibrinogen and myoglobin can bind as a whole to MHC-II molecules after they are denatured and their disulfide bonds are reduced (breaking the bond by adding hydrogen atoms across it). The proteases then degrade the exposed regions of the protein-MHC II-complex.

Antigen presentation 

After the processed antigen (peptide) is complexed to the MHC molecule, they both migrate together to the cell membrane, where they are exhibited (elaborated) as a complex that can be recognized by the CD 4+ (T helper cell) – a type of white blood cell. This is known as antigen presentation. However, the epitopes (conformational epitopes) that are recognized by the B cell prior to their digestion may not be the same as that presented to the T helper cell. Additionally, a B cell may present different peptides complexed to different MHC-II molecules.

T helper cell stimulation 

The CD 4+ cells through their T cell receptor-CD3 complex recognize the epitope-bound MHC II molecules on the surface of the antigen presenting cells, and get 'activated'. Upon this activation, these T cells proliferate and differentiate into Th2 cells. This makes them produce soluble chemical signals that promote their own survival. However, another important function that they carry out is the stimulation of B cell by establishing direct physical contact with them.

Co-stimulation of B cell by activated T helper cell 

Complete stimulation of T helper cells requires the B7 molecule present on the antigen presenting cell to bind with CD28 molecule present on the T cell surface (in close proximity with the T cell receptor). Likewise, a second interaction between the CD40 ligand or CD154 (CD40L) present on T cell surface and CD40 present on B cell surface, is also necessary. The same interactions that stimulate the T helper cell also stimulate the B cell, hence the term costimulation. The entire mechanism ensures that an activated T cell only stimulates a B cell that recognizes the antigen containing the same epitope as recognized by the T cell receptor of the "costimulating" T helper cell. The B cell gets stimulated, apart from the direct costimulation, by certain growth factors, viz., interleukins 2, 4, 5, and 6 in a paracrine fashion. These factors are usually produced by the newly activated T helper cell. However, this activation occurs only after the B cell receptor present on a memory or a naive B cell itself would have bound to the corresponding epitope, without which the initiating steps of phagocytosis and antigen processing would not have occurred.

Proliferation and differentiation of B cell 

A naive (or inexperienced) B cell is one which belongs to a clone which has never encountered the epitope to which it is specific. In contrast, a memory B cell is one which derives from an activated naive or memory  B cell. The activation of a naive or a memory B cell is followed by a manifold proliferation of that particular B cell, most of the progeny of which terminally differentiate into plasma B cells; the rest survive as memory B cells. So, when the naive cells belonging to a particular clone encounter their specific antigen to give rise to the plasma cells, and also leave a few memory cells, this is known as the primary immune response. In the course of proliferation of this clone, the B cell receptor genes can undergo  frequent (one in every two cell divisions) mutations in the genes coding for paratopes of antibodies. These frequent mutations are termed somatic hypermutation. Each such mutation alters the epitope-binding ability of the paratope slightly, creating new clones of B cells in the process. Some of the newly created paratopes bind more strongly to the same epitope (leading to the selection of the clones possessing them), which is known as affinity maturation. Other paratopes bind better to epitopes that are slightly different from the original epitope that had stimulated proliferation. Variations in the epitope structure are also usually produced by mutations in the genes of pathogen coding for their antigen. Somatic hypermutation, thus, makes the B cell receptors and the soluble antibodies in subsequent encounters with antigens, more inclusive in their antigen recognition potential of altered epitopes, apart from bestowing greater specificity for the antigen that induced proliferation in the first place. When the memory cells get stimulated by the antigen to produce plasma cells (just like in the clone's primary response), and leave even more memory cells in the process, this is known as a secondary immune response, which translates into greater numbers of plasma cells and faster rate of antibody production lasting for longer periods. The memory B cells produced as a part of secondary response recognize the corresponding antigen faster and bind more strongly with it (i.e., greater affinity of binding) owing to affinity maturation. The soluble antibodies produced by the clone show a similar enhancement in antigen binding.

Basis of polyclonality 
Responses are polyclonal in nature as each clone somewhat specializes in producing antibodies against a given epitope, and because, each antigen contains multiple epitopes, each of which in turn can be recognized by more than one clone of B cells. To be able to react to innumerable antigens, as well as multiple constituent epitopes, the immune system requires the ability to recognize a very great number of epitopes in all, i.e., there should be a great diversity of B cell clones.

Clonality of B cells 
Memory and naïve B cells normally exist in relatively small numbers.  As the body needs to be able to respond to a large number of potential pathogens, it maintains a pool of B cells with a wide range of specificities. Consequently, while there is almost always at least one B (naive or memory) cell capable of responding to any given epitope (of all that the immune system can react against), there are very few exact duplicates. However, when a single B cell encounters an antigen to which it can bind, it can proliferate very rapidly. Such a group of cells with identical specificity towards the epitope is known as a clone, and is derived from a common "mother" cell.  All the "daughter" B cells match the original "mother" cell in their epitope specificity, and they secrete antibodies with identical paratopes. These antibodies are monoclonal antibodies, since they derive from clones of the same parent cell. A polyclonal response is one in which clones of multiple B cells react to the same antigen.

Single antigen contains multiple overlapping epitopes 

A single antigen can be thought of as a sequence of multiple overlapping epitopes. Many unique B cell clones may be able to bind to the individual epitopes. This imparts even greater multiplicity to the overall response. All of these B cells can become activated and produce large colonies of plasma cell clones, each of which can secrete up to 1000 antibody molecules against each epitope per second.

Multiple clones recognize single epitope 
In addition to different B cells reacting to different epitopes on the same antigen, B cells belonging to different clones may also be able to react to the same epitope.  An epitope that can be attacked by many different B cells is said to be highly immunogenic.  In these cases, the binding affinities for respective epitope-paratope pairs vary, with some B cell clones producing antibodies that bind strongly to the epitope, and others producing antibodies that bind weakly.

Clonal selection 

The clones that bind to a particular epitope with greater strength are more likely to be selected for further proliferation in the germinal centers of the follicles in various lymphoid tissues like the lymph nodes. This is not unlike natural selection:  clones are selected for their fitness to attack the epitopes (strength of binding) on the encountered pathogen.
What makes the analogy even stronger is that the B lymphocytes have to compete with each other for signals that promote their survival in the germinal centers.

Diversity of B cell clones 
Although there are many diverse pathogens, many of which are constantly mutating, it is a surprise that a majority of individuals remain free of infections. Thus, maintenance of health requires the body to recognize all pathogens (antigens they present or produce) likely to exist. This is achieved by maintaining a pool of immensely large (about 109) clones of B cells, each of which reacts against a specific epitope by recognizing and producing antibodies against it. However, at any given time very few clones actually remain receptive to their specific epitope. Thus, approximately 107 different epitopes can be recognized by all the B cell clones combined. Moreover, in a lifetime, an individual usually requires the generation of antibodies against very few antigens in comparison with the number that the body can recognize and respond against.

Significance of the phenomenon

Increased probability of recognizing any antigen 
If an antigen can be recognized by more than one component of its structure, it is less likely to be "missed" by the immune system. Mutation of pathogenic organisms can result in modification of antigen—and, hence, epitope—structure. If the immune system "remembers" what the other epitopes look like, the antigen, and the organism, will still be recognized and subjected to the body's immune response. Thus, the polyclonal response widens the range of pathogens that can be recognized.

Limitation of immune system against rapidly mutating viruses 

Many viruses undergo frequent mutations that result in changes in amino acid composition of their important proteins. Epitopes located on the protein may also undergo alterations in the process. Such an altered epitope binds less strongly with the antibodies specific to the  unaltered epitope that would have stimulated the immune system. This is unfortunate because somatic hypermutation does give rise to clones capable of producing soluble antibodies that would have bound the altered epitope avidly enough to neutralize it. But these clones would consist of naive cells which are not allowed to proliferate by the weakly binding antibodies produced by the priorly stimulated clone. This doctrine is known as the original antigenic sin. This phenomenon comes into play particularly in immune responses against influenza, dengue and HIV viruses. This limitation, however, is not imposed by the phenomenon of polyclonal response, but rather, against it by an immune response that is biased in favor of experienced memory cells against the "novice" naive cells.

Increased chances of autoimmune reactions 

In autoimmunity the immune system wrongly recognizes certain native molecules in the body as foreign (self-antigen), and mounts an immune response against them. Since these native molecules, as normal parts of the body, will naturally always exist in the body, the attacks against them can get stronger over time (akin to secondary immune response). Moreover, many organisms exhibit molecular mimicry, which involves showing those antigens on their surface that are antigenically similar to the host proteins. This has two possible consequences: first, either the organism will be spared as a self antigen; or secondly, that the antibodies produced against it will also bind to the mimicked native proteins. The antibodies will attack the self-antigens and the tissues harboring them by activating various mechanisms like the complement activation and antibody-dependent cell-mediated cytotoxicity. Hence, wider the range of antibody-specificities, greater the chance that one or the other will react against self-antigens (native molecules of the body).

Difficulty in producing monoclonal antibodies 

Monoclonal antibodies are structurally identical immunoglobulin molecules with identical epitope-specificity (all of them bind with the same epitope with same affinity) as against their polyclonal counterparts which have varying affinities for the same epitope.
They are usually not produced in a natural immune response, but only in diseased states like multiple myeloma, or through specialized laboratory techniques. Because of their specificity, monoclonal antibodies are used in certain applications to quantify or detect the presence of substances (which act as antigen for the monoclonal antibodies), and for targeting individual cells (e.g. cancer cells).  Monoclonal antibodies find use in various diagnostic modalities (see: western blot and immunofluorescence) and therapies—particularly of cancer and diseases with autoimmune component. But, since virtually all responses in nature are polyclonal, it makes production of immensely useful monoclonal antibodies less straightforward.

History 
The first evidence of presence of a neutralizing substance in the blood that could counter infections came when Emil von Behring along with Kitasato Shibasaburō in 1890 developed effective serum against diphtheria. This they did by transferring serum produced from animals immunized against diphtheria to animals suffering from it. Transferring the serum thus could cure the infected animals. Behring was awarded the Nobel Prize for this work in 1901.

At this time though the chemical nature of what exactly in the blood conferred this protection was not known. In a few decades to follow, it was shown that the protective serum could neutralize and precipitate toxins, and clump bacteria. All these functions were attributed to different substances in the serum, and named accordingly as antitoxin, precipitin and agglutinin. That all the three substances were one entity (gamma globulins) was demonstrated by Elvin A. Kabat in 1939. In the preceding year Kabat had demonstrated the heterogeneity of antibodies through ultracentrifugation studies of horses' sera.

Until this time, cell-mediated immunity and humoral immunity were considered to be contending theories to explain effective immune response, but the former lagged behind owing to lack of advanced techniques. Cell-mediated immunity got an impetus in its recognition and study when in 1942, Merrill Chase successfully transferred immunity against tuberculosis between pigs by transferring white blood cells.

It was later shown in 1948 by Astrid Fagraeus in her doctoral thesis that the plasma B cells are specifically involved in antibody production. The role of lymphocytes in mediating both cell-mediated and humoral responses was demonstrated by James Gowans in 1959.

In order to account for the wide range of antigens the immune system can recognize, Paul Ehrlich in 1900 had hypothesized that preexisting "side chain receptors" bind a given pathogen, and that this interaction induces the cell exhibiting the receptor to multiply and produce more copies of the same receptor. This theory, called the selective theory was not proven for next five decades, and had been challenged by several instructional theories which were based on the notion that an antibody would assume its effective structure by folding around the antigen. In the late 1950s however, the works of three scientists—Jerne, Talmage and Burnet (who largely modified the theory)—gave rise to the clonal selection theory, which proved all the elements of Ehrlich's hypothesis except that the specific receptors that could neutralize the agent were soluble and not membrane-bound.

The clonal selection theory was proved correct when Sir Gustav Nossal showed that each B cell always produces only one antibody.

In 1974, the role of MHC in antigen presentation was demonstrated by Rolf Zinkernagel and Peter C. Doherty.

See also 
 Polyclonal antibodies
 Antigen processing
 Antiserum, a polyclonal antibody preparation used to treat envenomation

Notes

References

Further reading

External links 
 An Introduction to the Immune system

Immune system
Immunology
Cell biology